Aligarh Assembly constituency is a constituency of the Aligarh district of Uttar Pradesh (U.P.). VVPAT facilities with electronic voting machines (EVM) will be used in 2017 in U.P. assembly polls.

Legislative Assembly members

Election results

2022

2017

See also
 List of constituencies of the Uttar Pradesh Legislative Assembly
 Aligarh district

References

External links
 
 Official Site of Legislature in Uttar Pradesh
Uttar Pradesh Government website
UP Assembly

Assembly constituencies of Uttar Pradesh
Aligarh
Politics of Aligarh district